Kilpi is a Finnish heavy metal band, singing in Finnish.

History 
"Kilpi" means shield in Finnish. It is the guitarist and band creator's last name, Petteri Kilpi. The band's first album, Sähkönsinistä Sinfoniaa, was released on May 28, 2003, some months after their first single, "Nerokasta Ikävää". On September 29, 2004, they released their second album, II Taso. In 2006 they released the album Kaaoksen Kuningas, and two of its songs, "Toinen Minä" and "Katharsis" were proposed to Eurovision Song Contest 2006. The band lost out to Lordi, finishing sixth overall in the Finnish televoting with the song "Toinen Minä". The band's first live-album Kaaos-Live was released in 2007. The band's vocalist, was a member of the Finnish band Altaria.

Discography 
Sähkönsinistä Sinfoniaa (2003)
II Taso (2004)
Kaaoksen Kuningas (2006)
Kaaos-Live (2007)
IV (2008)
Pirun Merta (2009)
Juggernautti (2015)

Singles 
 Nerokasta Ikävää  (2003)
 Villin vaaran kosto  (2003)
 Pahalle et käännä selkää  (2003)
 Sielut iskee tulta  (2004)
 Eilinen  (2004)
 Varjoista valoihin  (2004)
 Ihminen  (2006)
 Laske kuolleet ja rukoile  (2006)
 Kaaoksen Kuningas  (2006)
 Katharsis  (2007)
 Sisäinen Vihollinen  (2008)
 Tuli, Vesi, Ilma ja Maa  (2008)
 Kunnes Kuolema Meidät Erottaa  (2008)
 Viinapiru  (2009)
 Käännetään maailma  (2010)
 Lautta  (2012)
 Rakkaus vapauttaa  (2012)
 Juggernautti  (2015)
 Kasikus  (2017)
 Taiteilija  (2018)

External links
Official site in Finnish, also contains a description of the band in English
Official MySpace page

Finnish musical groups
Finnish heavy metal musical groups
Musical groups established in 2003